Meddie Kagere (born 10 October 1986) is a Rwandan footballer who plays for Singida Big Stars F.C. in the Tanzanian Premier League and the Rwanda national team as a forward.

Career

KF Tirana
Kagere signed for his first European club during the summer transfer window of 2014 with mlewa msasa namba 9 matata, when he joined Albanian Superliga side KF Tirana on a two-year deal after agreeing to pay his previous club Rayon Sports FC the $10,000 release clause in his contract.

On 1 January 2015, Kagere was released by KF Tirana.

Simba S.C.
Having impressed in the 2018 SportPesa Super Cup, when he was the Gor Mahia F.C player, scored the first goal against Simba S.C., finally the Tanzanian Premier League champions, signed him after weeks of rumours.

Singida Big Stars F.C.
On 4th August 2022, during Singida Big Stars Day, Kagere was seen training before the match against Zanaco F.C. of Zambia confirming rumors that Kagere has departed Simba S.C. thus Kagere is a new big signing for them after Singida Big Stars F.C. has been promoted to Tanzania Premier League for the first time in 2022/2023 season.

International goals
Scores and results list Rwanda's goal tally first.

References

External links
 
 

1986 births
Living people
Sportspeople from Kampala
Association football midfielders
Association football forwards
Rwandan footballers
Rwanda international footballers
Ugandan footballers
Ugandan emigrants to Rwanda
Rwandan people of Ugandan descent
S.C. Kiyovu Sports players
Police F.C. (Rwanda) players
ES Zarzis players
Rayon Sports F.C. players
KF Tirana players
Gor Mahia F.C. players
Rwandan expatriate sportspeople in Tunisia
Rwandan expatriates in Albania
Rwandan expatriates in Kenya
Expatriate footballers in Tunisia
Expatriate footballers in Albania
Expatriate footballers in Kenya
ATRACO F.C. players